The Netsuite Open 2014 is the 2014's Netsuite Open, which is a tournament of the PSA World Tour event International (prize money: $70,000). The event took place at the Standford Squash in San Francisco in the United States from 24 to 30 of September. Grégory Gaultier won his second Netsuite Open trophy, beating Amr Shabana in the final.

Prize money and ranking points
For 2014, the prize purse was $70,000. The prize money and points breakdown is as follows:

Seeds

Draw and results

See also
PSA World Tour 2014
Netsuite Open

References

External links
PSA Netsuite Open 2014 website
Netsuite Open official website

Netsuite Open
Netsuite Open Squash
2014 in American sports
2014 in squash